Stientje van Veldhoven-van der Meer (born 22 June 1973) is a Dutch politician serving as Minister for the Environment and Housing in the Third Rutte cabinet since 2019. A member of the Democrats 66 (D66) party, she served as State Secretary for Infrastructure and Water Management from 2017 to 2019.

Career
A diplomat and civil servant by occupation, Van Veldhoven studied policy and management in international organisations at the University of Groningen. She worked at the Ministry of Economic Affairs and Climate Policy and for the European Union in Brussels. She was elected political talent of the year 2012/2013 by the Dutch national radio and television broadcaster, Nederlandse Omroep Stichting (NOS).

She was elected to the House of Representatives from 17 June 2010 until her appointment as State Secretary for Infrastructure and Water Management. As a parliamentarian, she focused on matters of climate, energy, natural environment, agriculture, fishery, animal rights and development aid. In 2019, she was appointed minister without portfolio at the Ministry of the Interior and Kingdom Relations.

References
  Parlement.com biography

External links

  House of Representatives biography

1973 births
Living people
Democrats 66 politicians
Dutch civil servants
Dutch women diplomats
21st-century Dutch diplomats
Members of the House of Representatives (Netherlands)
State Secretaries for Infrastructure of the Netherlands
Women government ministers of the Netherlands
Politicians from Utrecht (city)
University of Groningen alumni
21st-century Dutch politicians
21st-century Dutch women politicians